Martina Hingis was the defending champion, but did not compete this year. Hingis would retire from professional tennis one month later.

Lindsay Davenport won the title by defeating Monica Seles 6–7(6–8), 6–1, 6–2 in the final. It was the first title in the season for Davenport and the 38th of her career.

Seeds
The first four seeds received a bye into the second round.

Draw

Finals

Top half

Bottom half

References

External links
 Main and Qualifying Draws (WTA)
 ITF tournament profile

Toray Pan Pacific Open
Pan Pacific Open
2003 Toray Pan Pacific Open